The Wanderings of the Avener is the debut studio album by French deep house and electro music producer The Avener. It was released in France on 19 January 2015 and peaked at No. 2.

Reviews
Jonty Czuchwicki from TheMusic.com.au gave the album 3 out of 5, saying; "This album is a lesson in smooth and laid-back instrumental house music. There are wobbly keyboard lines, twangy guitar licks and plenty of well-placed bass lines that'll have your foot tapping. The jazz-soul-meets-electro is a naturalistic fusion and the atmosphere is always thick enough to cut with a knife, enticing with an air of mystery and intrigue."

Track listing

Charts

Weekly charts

Year-end charts

Certifications

Release history

References

2015 debut albums
The Avener albums
Capitol Records albums